Mamoru Yamaguchi (born May 29, 1977) is a Japanese mixed martial artist who competes in Pancrase. He is the former Shooto Bantamweight (123 lb) Champion, former Shooto Featherweight (132 lb) Champion, former Pancrase Flyweight Champion, as well as a former King of the Cage Junior Flyweight Champion. Mamoru is known for his counter striking and his trilogy with the former Shooto Bantamweight Champion Shinichi Kojima. 

He has been consistently ranked as one of the top flyweight in the world by Sherdog's Official Mixed Martial Arts Rankings. He is considered, by Fight Matrix, to be the third best flyweight in the history of mixed martial arts.

His afro is a tribute to Japanese boxing legend, Yoko Gushiken.

Martial arts career
Yamaguchi made his professional debut in 1999 during Shooto - Renaxis 2, against Shuichiro Katsumura.

After making his debut, Yamaguchi went on a five fight unbeaten streak. He earned a decision win over Jin Akimoto, a submission win over Ryan Diaz, a TKO win over Baret Yoshida, a draw against Masaru Gokita and a knee KO win over Yoshinobu Ota. These victories entitled win a fight for the inaugural Shooto Featherweight (132 lb) Championship, in a rematch against Jin Akimoto. Yamaguchi won a unanimous decision.

After defeating Gildo Lima by an armbar, Yamaguchi was to defend his title against Masahiro Oishi. He lost through a triangle armbar.

Yamaguchi would drop down to bantamweight and accumulate a 2-1 record. He was given a chance to win the inaugural Shooto Bantamweight (123 lb) Championship, when he faced Yasuhiro Urushitani. He won a unanimous decision, winning a Shooto title in two different weight classes. This was the first fight where he wore his iconic afro.

He beat Hiroaki Yoshioka in a rematch with a knee to the body, and defended his bantamweight title in a rematch against Robson Moura. He went on a four fight winning streak, most notably beating Junji Ikoma, before defending the bantamweight title for the second time against Shinichi Kojima. This would be the beginning of their rivalry. 

Afterwards he TKO'd Setsu Iguchi and Erikas Suslovas, before rematching Shinichi Kojima. He lost in by way of rear naked choke in the first round. Achieving three wins in his next four fights, he fought Shinichi Kojima for the third time. He lost by way of guillotine choke.

Moving to King of the Cage he won the junior flyweight title by defeating Frank Baca with a rear naked choke. He fought Greg Guzman next, but the fight wasn't a title defense, as his opponent missed weight.

Returning to Japan, he fought mainly in Vale Tudo Japan. He won three fights, most notably against Yosuke  Saruta, lost four and drew twice. He found greater success in Pancrase winning three of his next four fights. Interestingly, all four fights were split decisions.  He was then scheduled to fight Ryuichi Miki during Pancrase: 285. He won through a split decision, winning his fourth major career title.

He lost the title after dropping a unanimous decision to Senzo Ikeda. He fought once in 2018, losing by way of TKO to Yuya Wakamatsu, and once in 2019, losing a unanimous decision to Toru Ogawa.

Championships and Accomplishments
Shooto
Shooto Bantamweight (123 lb) Championship (One time)
Two successful title defenses
Shooto Featherweight (132 lb) Championship (One time)
King of the Cage
King of the Cage Junior Flyweight Championship (One time)
Pancrase
Pancrase Flyweight Championship (One time)

Mixed martial arts record

|-
| Loss
| align=center| 31–13–5
| Toru Ogawa
| Decision (unanimous)
| Pancrase: 305
| 
| align=center| 3
| align=center| 5:00
| Tokyo, Japan
|
|-
| Loss
| align=center| 31–12–5
| Yuya Wakamatsu
| TKO (punches)
| Pancrase: 297
| 
| align=center| 2
| align=center| 0:39
| Tokyo, Japan
|
|-
| Loss
| align=center| 31–11–5
| Senzo Ikeda
| Decision (unanimous)
| Pancrase: 289
| 
| align=center| 5
| align=center| 5:00
| Tokyo, Japan
| 
|-
| Win
| align=center| 31–10–5
| Ryuichi Miki
| Decision (split)
| Pancrase: 285
| 
| align=center| 5
| align=center| 5:00
| Tokyo, Japan
| 
|-
| Win
| align=center| 30–10–5
| Luis Nogueira
| Decision (split)
| Pancrase: 281
| 
| align=center| 3
| align=center| 5:00
| Tokyo, Japan
|
|-
| Win
| align=center| 29–10–5
| Senzo Ikeda
| Decision (split)
| Pancrase: 277
| 
| align=center| 3
| align=center| 5:00
| Tokyo, Japan
|
|-
| Loss
| align=center| 28–10–5
| Yuki Yasunaga
| Decision (split)
| Pancrase: 273
| 
| align=center| 3
| align=center| 5:00
| Tokyo, Japan
|
|-
|  Win
| align=center| 28–9–5
| Yusuke Kitago
| Decision (split)
| Pancrase: 269
| 
| align=center| 3
| align=center| 5:00
| Tokyo, Japan
|
|-
|  Draw
| align=center| 27–9–5
| Kosuke Suzuki
| Draw (split)
| Shooto: Mobstyles 15th Anniversary Tour Fight & Mosh
| 
| align=center| 3
| align=center| 5:00
| Tokyo, Japan
|
|-
|  Win
| align=center| 27–9–4
| Yosuke Saruta
| TKO (doctor stoppage)
| Vale Tudo Japan: VTJ 6th
| 
| align=center| 2
| align=center| 0:25
| Ota, Tokyo, Japan
|
|-
|  Loss
| align=center| 26–9–4
| Czar Sklavos
| Submission (rear-naked choke)
| Vale Tudo Japan: VTJ 4th
| 
| align=center| 1
| align=center| 1:28
| Tokyo, Japan
|
|-
|  Draw
| align=center| 26–8–4
| Yoshiro Maeda
| Draw (majority)
| Deep: Tribe Tokyo Fight
| 
| align=center| 3
| align=center| 5:00
| Tokyo, Japan
|
|-
|  Loss
| align=center| 26–8–3
| Mikihito Yamagami
| Decision (majority)
| Vale Tudo Japan: VTJ 2nd
| 
| align=center| 3
| align=center| 5:00
| Tokyo, Japan
| 
|-
|  Loss
| align=center| 26–7–3
| Darrell Montague
| Decision (split)
| Vale Tudo Japan: VTJ 1st
| 
| align=center| 3
| align=center| 5:00
| Tokyo, Japan
| 
|-
|  Loss
| align=center| 26–6–3
| Jussier da Silva
| Decision (unanimous)
| Tachi Palace Fights 10
| 
| align=center| 3
| align=center| 5:00
| Lemoore, California, United States
| 
|-
|  Win
| align=center| 26–5–3
| Kevin Dunsmoor
| KO (punch)
| TPF 9: The Contenders
| 
| align=center| 2
| align=center| 4:03
| Lemoore, California, United States
| 
|-
|  Win
| align=center| 25–5–3
| Fumihiro Kitahara
| KO (head kick)
| Shooto: The Way of Shooto 6: Like a Tiger, Like a Dragon
| 
| align=center| 1
| align=center| 2:33
| Tokyo, Japan
| 
|-
|  Win
| align=center| 24–5–3
| Greg Guzman
| TKO (elbows)
| KOTC: Sniper
| 
| align=center| 2
| align=center| 2:21
| San Bernardino, California, United States
| 
|-
|  Win
| align=center| 23–5–3
| Frank Baca
| Submission (rear-naked choke)
| KOTC: Toryumon
| 
| align=center| 2
| align=center| 1:54
| Okinawa, Japan
| 
|-
|  Win
| align=center| 22–5–3
| Kiyotaka Shimizu
| Decision (majority)
| Shooto: Revolutionary Exchanges 3
| 
| align=center| 3
| align=center| 5:00
| Tokyo, Japan
| 
|-
|  Win
| align=center| 21–5–3
| Jesse Taitano
| TKO (punches)
| Vale Tudo Japan 2009
| 
| align=center| 1
| align=center| 4:41
| Tokyo, Japan
| 
|-
|  Loss
| align=center| 20–5–3
| Shinichi Kojima
| Submission (guillotine choke)
| Shooto: Shooto Tradition 2
| 
| align=center| 3
| align=center| 3:42
| Tokyo, Japan
| 
|-
|  Win
| align=center| 20–4–3
| Masaaki Sugawara
| Decision (unanimous)
| Shooto: Back To Our Roots 8
| 
| align=center| 3
| align=center| 5:00
| Tokyo, Japan
| 
|-
|  Win
| align=center| 19–4–3
| Yuki Shoujou
| Decision (unanimous)
| Shooto: Shooting Disco 4: Born in the Fighting
| 
| align=center| 3
| align=center| 5:00
| Tokyo, Japan
| 
|-
|  Loss
| align=center| 18–4–3
| Yasuhiro Urushitani
| Decision (unanimous)
| Shooto: Back To Our Roots 5
| 
| align=center| 3
| align=center| 5:00
| Tokyo, Japan
| 
|-
|  Win
| align=center| 18–3–3
| Yusei Shimokawa
| Decision (unanimous)
| Shooto: Shooting Disco 1: Saturday Night Hero
| 
| align=center| 3
| align=center| 5:00
| Tokyo, Japan
| 
|-
|  Loss
| align=center| 17–3–3
| Shinichi Kojima
| Technical submission (rear naked choke)
| Shooto: Champion Carnival
| 
| align=center| 1
| align=center| 1:38
| Tokyo, Japan
| 
|-
|  Win
| align=center| 17–2–3
| Erikas Suslovas
| TKO (punches)
| Shooto 2006: 9/8 in Korakuen Hall
| 
| align=center| 1
| align=center| 2:14
| Tokyo, Japan
| 
|-
|  Win
| align=center| 16–2–3
| Setsu Iguchi
| TKO (cut)
| Shooto: The Devilock
| 
| align=center| 1
| align=center| 2:45
| Tokyo, Japan
| 
|-
| Draw
| align=center| 15–2–3
| Shinichi Kojima
| Draw
| Shooto: 3/24 in Korakuen Hall
| 
| align=center| 3
| align=center| 5:00
| Tokyo, Japan
| 
|-
|  Win
| align=center| 15–2–2
| Daiji Takahashi
| Decision (unanimous)
| Shooto: 12/17 in Shinjuku Face
| 
| align=center| 3
| align=center| 5:00
| Tokyo, Japan
| 
|-
|  Win
| align=center| 14–2–2
| Pat Seidel
| Submission (rear naked choke)
| Shooto: 9/23 in Korakuen Hall
| 
| align=center| 2
| align=center| 1:35
| Tokyo, Japan
| 
|-
|  Win
| align=center| 13–2–2
| Stonnie Dennis
| KO (kick)
| Shooto: 5/4 in Korakuen Hall
| 
| align=center| 1
| align=center| 1:36
| Tokyo, Japan
| 
|-
|  Win
| align=center| 12–2–2
| Junji Ikoma
| Decision (unanimous)
| Shooto: 1/29 in Korakuen Hall
| 
| align=center| 3
| align=center| 5:00
| Tokyo, Japan
| 
|-
| Draw
| align=center| 11–2–2
| Robson Moura
| Draw
| Shooto: 9/26 in Kourakuen Hall
| 
| align=center| 3
| align=center| 5:00
| Tokyo, Japan
| 
|-
|  Win
| align=center| 11–2–1
| Hiroaki Yoshioka
| KO (knee to the body)
| Shooto 2004: 5/3 in Korakuen Hall
| 
| align=center| 3
| align=center| 4:41
| Tokyo, Japan
| 
|-
|  Win
| align=center| 10–2–1
| Yasuhiro Urushitani
| Decision (unanimous)
| Shooto: Year End Show 2003
| 
| align=center| 3
| align=center| 5:00
| Tokyo, Japan
| 
|-
|  Win
| align=center| 9–2–1
| Homare Kuboyama
| Decision (unanimous)
| Shooto: 3/18 in Korakuen Hall
| 
| align=center| 3
| align=center| 5:00
| Tokyo, Japan
| 
|-
|  Loss
| align=center| 8–2–1
| Robson Moura
| Decision (unanimous)
| Shooto: Treasure Hunt 10
| 
| align=center| 3
| align=center| 5:00
| Tokyo, Japan
| 
|-
|  Win
| align=center| 8–1–1
| Hiroaki Yoshioka
| Decision (unanimous)
| Shooto: Wanna Shooto 2002
| 
| align=center| 3
| align=center| 5:00
| Tokyo, Japan
| 
|-
|  Loss
| align=center| 7–1–1
| Masahiro Oishi
| Submission (triangle/armbar)
| Shooto: To The Top 10
| 
| align=center| 1
| align=center| 1:44
| Tokyo, Japan
| 
|-
|  Win
| align=center| 7–0–1
| Gildo Lima
| Submission (armbar)
| Shooto: To The Top 2
| 
| align=center| 1
| align=center| 3:57
| Tokyo, Japan
| 
|-
|  Win
| align=center| 6–0–1
| Jin Akimoto
| Decision (unanimous)
| Shooto: R.E.A.D. Final
| 
| align=center| 3
| align=center| 5:00
| Tokyo, Japan
| 
|-
|  Win
| align=center| 5–0–1
| Yoshinobu Ota
| KO (knee)
| Shooto: R.E.A.D. 9
| 
| align=center| 3
| align=center| 2:21
| Tokyo, Japan
| 
|-
| Draw
| align=center| 4–0–1
| Masaru Gokita
| Draw
| Shooto: R.E.A.D. 2
| 
| align=center| 2
| align=center| 5:00
| Tokyo, Japan
| 
|-
|  Win
| align=center| 4–0
| Baret Yoshida
| TKO (punches)
| Superbrawl 15
| 
| align=center| 3
| align=center| 1:18
| Honolulu, Hawaii, United States
| 
|-
|  Win
| align=center| 3–0
| Ryan Diaz
| Submission (armbar)
| Shooto: Gateway to the Extremes
| 
| align=center| 2
| align=center| 3:35
| Tokyo, Japan
| 
|-
|  Win
| align=center| 2–0
| Jin Akimoto
| Decision (majority)
| Shooto: Renaxis 4
| 
| align=center| 2
| align=center| 5:00
| Tokyo, Japan
| 
|-
|  Win
| align=center| 1–0
| Shuichiro Katsumura
| Decision (unanimous)
| Shooto: Renaxis 2
| 
| align=center| 2
| align=center| 5:00
| Tokyo, Japan
|

Kickboxing record

|-  bgcolor="#CCFFCC"
| 2012-02-05 || Win ||align=left| Kazuyuki Fushimi || Shootboxing 2012 - Act 1 || Tokyo, Japan || Decision (majority) || 3 || 3:00 || 4-1
|-  bgcolor="#CCFFCC"
| 2009-09-04 || Win ||align=left| Masahiro Fujimoto || Shootboxing - Bushido Road 4 || Tokyo, Japan || Decision (unanimous) || 3 || 3:00 || 3-1
|-  bgcolor="#CCFFCC"
| 2009-05-01 || Win ||align=left| Naguranchan Masa M16 || Shootboxing - Bushido Road 3 || Tokyo, Japan || Decision (unanimous) || 3 || 3:00 || 2-1
|-  bgcolor="#ffbbbb"
| 2009-04-03 || Loss ||align=left| Akito Sakimura || Shootboxing - Bushido Road || Tokyo, Japan || Decision (unanimous) || 3 || 3:00 || 1-1
|-  bgcolor="#CCFFCC"
| 2009-02-11 || Win ||align=left| Noriyuki Enari || Shootboxing 2009 - Act 1 || Tokyo, Japan || Decision (unanimous) || 3 || 3:00 || 1-0
|-
| colspan=9 | Legend:

References

External links

Living people
1977 births
Japanese male mixed martial artists
Flyweight mixed martial artists
Mixed martial artists utilizing Muay Thai
Mixed martial artists utilizing shootboxing
Mixed martial artists utilizing judo
Japanese male kickboxers
Bantamweight kickboxers
Japanese Muay Thai practitioners
Japanese male judoka